Solar power in Saudi Arabia has become more important to the country as oil prices have risen. In 2011, over 50% of electricity was produced by burning oil. The Saudi agency in charge of developing the nations renewable energy sector, Ka-care, announced in May 2012 that the nation would install 41 gigawatts (GW) of solar capacity by 2032.  It was projected to be composed of 25 GW of solar thermal, and 16 GW of photovoltaics.  At the time of this announcement, Saudi Arabia had only 0.003 gigawatts of installed solar energy capacity. A total of 54 GW was expected by 2032, and 24 GW was expected in 2020, which was never reached. 1,100 megawatts (MW) of photovoltaics and 900 megawatts of concentrated solar thermal (CSP) was expected to be completed by early 2013. 
Also in 2013, solar power in Saudi Arabia had achieved grid parity and was able to produce electricity at costs comparable to conventional sources.

In March 2018 Saudi Arabia announced that together with Softbank they plan to install 200 GW of solar power through 2030. This compares to a global solar power installation of 100 GW in 2017 and a total installed capacity of 77 GW in Saudi Arabia in 2016. This project was cancelled in September 2018.

History 
In 2011, The United States and Saudi Arabia jointly set up a solar-research station in Al-Uyaynah village. The village, located about 30 miles northwest of Riyadh, had no electric supply at the time. The station is operated by the King Abdulaziz City for Science and Technology. The agency established an experimental assembly line at the site to manufacture solar panels. The equipment on the assembly line was imported from Europe, and the solar cells are imported from Taiwan. The line's capacity was quadrupled within a year.

Saudi Arabia's first solar power plant was commissioned on October 2, 2011, on Farasan Island. It is a 500 kW fixed tilt photovoltaic plant.

Given that the cost of solar projects decreased by roughly 90 percent in the 2010s, petrostates in the Middle East have raised their ambitions. Saudi Arabia had about 500 megawatts of renewable electricity capacity in 2020, but targets 60 gigawatts, most of which would come from solar photovoltaics and concentrated solar power, by 2030. This has incentivized announcements for private sector solar projects which have a highly competitive bid price in terms of levelized cost of electricity.

See also

 Energy in Saudi Arabia

References